In enzymology, a monoterpenol beta-glucosyltransferase is an enzyme that catalyzes the chemical reaction

UDP-glucose + (-)-menthol  UDP + (-)-menthyl O-beta-D-glucoside

Thus, the two substrates of this enzyme are UDP-glucose and (-)-menthol, whereas its two products are UDP and (-)-menthyl O-beta-D-glucoside.

This enzyme belongs to the family of glycosyltransferases, specifically the hexosyltransferases.  The systematic name of this enzyme class is UDP-glucose:(-)-menthol O-beta-D-glucosyltransferase. Other names in common use include uridine diphosphoglucose-monoterpenol glucosyltransferase, and UDPglucose:monoterpenol glucosyltransferase.

References

 

EC 2.4.1
Enzymes of unknown structure